Joseph Gerard Haubrich (born September 10, 1958) is an economist and consultant. His work focuses on financial institution and regulations research.

Personal
Haubrich was born on September 10, 1958 in Oak Park, Illinois to Joseph Haubrich and Alfreda Haubrich.

Education and career
Haubrich earned his bachelor's degree in economics at the University of Chicago.  Then, he earned his masters and doctoral degrees in economics in New York at the University of Rochester.  Then, Joseph moved to Pennsylvania and became an assistant professor of finance in University of Pennsylvania's business school, Wharton School.  In 1990, Joseph joined the Federal Reserve Bank of Cleveland as an economist and consultant in the research department.  His focuses in his work include financial institution and regulations research.  He is now a vice president at the Cleveland Federal Reserve Bank of Cleveland and leads the Research Department's Banking and Financial Institutions Group.  He also examines and referees many educational and professional journals and writings.

Work
On Mortgage-backed security, Joseph wrote and was quoted "A collateralized mortgage obligation (CMO) is a more complex MBS in which the mortgages are ordered into tranches by some quality (such as repayment time), with each tranche sold as a separate security."
Joseph also has written lots for the Annual Reports, including Putting Systemic Risk on the Radar Screen in the 2009 Annual Report. This report selection describes and analyzes the United States' 2008 financial crisis, regulatory reforms, plans to break up huge companies,  consumer protection agencies, derivatives, insurance companies, and hedge funds.

He co-wrote "Peak Oil" which is an economic commentary with Brent Meyer that discusses the economic effects of the world's oil production. This piece is used in a variety of research, detailing on the relationship between oil, the economy, and society.

Recent articles and papers by Haubrich include:
W(h)ither the Fed's Balance Sheet in July 2010 by Joseph G. Haubrich, John B. Carlson, and John Linder
Inflation: Noise, Risk, and Expectations in June 2010 by Joseph G. Haubrich and Timothy Bianco
A New Approach to Gauging Inflation Expectations in October 2009 by Joseph G. Haubrich 
Credit Crises, Money and Contradictions:A Historical View in September 2009 by Joseph G. Haubrich and Michael D. Bordo
Umbrella Supervision and the Role of the Central Bank for the Journal of Banking Regulation Volume 57 No. 1, by Joseph G. Haubrich and James B. Thomson in November 2008
"How Cyclical Is Bank Capital?" by Joseph G. Haubrich; published in 2015.

Joseph Haubrich is also listed as one of the top 5% of authors according to the criteria from IDEAS from RePEc

In 2014, Joseph produced a documentary film which illustrates the Panic of 1907.  This film stemmed from a 2012 study he worked on with Michael Bordo at the Cleveland Federal Reserve Bank.  A paper covering this topic is titled Deep Recessions, Fast Recoveries, and Financial Crises: Evidence from the American Record written in conjunction with Bordo in 2013. This film can be viewed at the Museum of American Finance.

Joseph co-edited the book "Quantifying Systemic Risk" with Andrew Lo, and addresses the challenges faced when measuring statistical risk  This book was released in 2013.

References

Living people
21st-century American economists
Wharton School of the University of Pennsylvania alumni
University of Chicago alumni
1958 births